Hong Kong Cable Television Limited, formerly known as Wharf Cable Television Limited until 31 October 1998, is a cable television provider in Hong Kong currently owned by Forever Top (Asia) Limited, which operates it as a part of i-Cable Communications business. It was the second company to provide cable television service in Hong Kong (after Rediffusion Television, which ceased cable operation with the launch of their terrestrial television channels in 1973). It was incorporated on 30 June 1993 and officially inaugurated on 31 October same year, offering a package of over 100 pay television channels, 54 of which are directly operated by the company.

History 
The company was founded as Wharf Cable Television, incorporated on 30 June 1993. Cable-based transmissions were officially inaugurated by the Governor of Hong Kong Chris Patten. It went on air with eight channels, including the world's first 24-hour Cantonese news channel.

Wharf Cable Television changed its name to Hong Kong Cable Television on 31 October 1998. It was listed on the Hong Kong Stock Exchange in 1999 under i-Cable Communications.

In October 2001, Hong Kong Cable Television became the first cable television company in Hong Kong to carry live broadcasts of UEFA Euro 2004 on its channels. In later years, it carried live coverage of the 2002, 2006 and 2010 FIFA World Cup, as well as the 2012 Summer Olympics in London.

With the largest number of subscribers of subscription television companies in Hong Kong, HKCTV became one of the top five media groups in Hong Kong. According to the financial summary of i-CABLE Communications Limited in 2004, its sales revenue reaches HK$2,372 million with a profit of HK$296 million.

In February 2023, Cable TV announced to fold their pay-television licenses over to the Hong Kong government six years earlier than planned as they not longer compete with Now TV and TVB's MyTV SUPER, alongside with streaming giants Netflix and Disney+. The pay-TV services would stop operations on 1 June of the same year.

Ownership 
Hong Kong Cable Television Limited was owned as a subsidiary group of The Wharf (Holdings) Limited, which held 73.3% of HKCTV's shares. The rest of its ownership lies with public shareholders. It became a public listed company on the Hong Kong Stock Exchange in 1999.

HKCTV is operated by i-Cable Communications, a non-media conglomerates in Hong Kong which also operates a pay-TV service and a broadband Internet access service provider with an Internet Protocol network. i-Cable owns and runs the second largest two-way broadband network, which produces media programmes, online news and other Internet services.

In 2017, i-Cable was sold to Forever Top (Asia) Limited.

In 2021, Henry Cheng Kar-Chun, the chairman of New World Development, pumped up his stake in i-Cable by acquiring shares from chairman of Far East Consortium David Chiu Tat-cheong through Cheng's company Celestial Pioneer. This increased Celestial Pioneer's stake in Forever Top from 31.5% to 72%, making it the largest shareholder of the company.

Controversy 
i-Cable TV fired at least 40 journalists, editors, and production crew, including the whole team of News Lancet (an award-winning investigative journalism show) in December 2020. The management claimed the firings were simply to "save resources." However, Hong Kong Journalists' Association (HKJA) questioned the real aim was reducing or eliminating the reporting of sensitive news, after the team of News Lancet covered stories critical of the police and the authorities in 2019.

References

External links 
 Hong Kong Cable Enterprises Limited
 Hong Kong Cable Television Limited
 i-Cable Satellite TV Limited
 i-cable.com
 The Wharf (Holdings) Limited

Cable television in Hong Kong
The Wharf (Holdings)
Television stations in Hong Kong
Television channels and stations established in 1993